Roberto Omegna (27 May 1876 – 29 November 1948) was an Italian cinematographer and film director.

Biography
Omegna assisted Arturo Ambrosio is setting up the Turin-based company Ambrosio Film, which became one of the leading Italian studios of the silent era. While Omegna directed a number of fiction films, he became best known for his documentary efforts such as The Leopard Hunt (1908) and Elephants at Work (1911).

Selected filmography

Cinematographer 
 The Last Days of Pompeii (1908)

References

Bibliography 
 Moliterno, Gino. Historical Dictionary of Italian Cinema. Scarecrow Press, 2008.

External links 
 

1876 births
1948 deaths
Italian cinematographers
Italian film directors
Film people from Turin